This is a list of minister from Anandiben Patel cabinets starting from May 22, 2014, to August 7, 2016. Anandiben Patel is the leader of Bharatiya Janata Party was sworn in the Chief Ministers of Gujarat on May 22, 2014.

Patel took oath as the 15th Chief Minister of Gujarat succeeding Narendra Modi, after the later was elected as Prime Minister of India following the victory of Bharatiya Janata Party in the 2014 Indian general election. She was the first woman Chief Minister of the state. She resigned on August 1, 2016, as she was turning 75 years old on November 21, 2016. She continued to hold the office until her successor Vijay Rupani took over on August 7, 2016.

Here is the list of the ministers of his ministry.

Cabinet Ministers 

|}

Ministers of state 

|}

See also 

 Government of Gujarat
 Gujarat Legislative Assembly

References

Government of Gujarat
Bharatiya Janata Party state ministries
2014 in Indian politics
Patel A

2014 establishments in Gujarat
2016 disestablishments in India
Cabinets established in 2014
Cabinets disestablished in 2016